Jacopo Manconi (born 24 April 1994) is an Italian footballer who plays for Italian Serie C club AlbinoLeffe.

Biography
Born in Milan, Lombardy, Manconi was a player for the reserve team of Piedmontese club Novara in 2012–13 season. He was signed from Villanterio in a temporary deal on 21 August 2012. Manconi made his Serie B debut during 2013–14 Serie B. He followed the club relegated to Lega Pro in 2014. On 2 February 2015 Manconi and Gustavo Vagenin were signed by fellow third level club Lecce, with Luigi Della Rocca moved to Novara. Novara promoted back to Serie B in 2015.

Manconi wore no.28 shirt for Novara in 2015–16 Serie B season.

On 15 July 2016, he was signed by Reggiana in a temporary deal.

On 10 July 2019, he signed a 2-year contract with Serie B club Perugia. On 21 August 2019, he was loaned to Gubbio. On 16 January 2020, he joined Giana Erminio on loan.

On 17 September 2020, he moved to AlbinoLeffe.

Honours
Livorno Calcio
Serie C: 2017–18

Individual
Serie C – Girone A top scorer: 2020–21 (15 goals)

References

External links
 

1994 births
Footballers from Milan
Living people
Italian footballers
Italy youth international footballers
Association football forwards
Novara F.C. players
U.S. Lecce players
F.C. Pavia players
A.C. Reggiana 1919 players
Trapani Calcio players
A.C. Carpi players
U.S. Livorno 1915 players
A.C. Perugia Calcio players
A.S. Gubbio 1910 players
A.S. Giana Erminio players
U.C. AlbinoLeffe players
Serie B players
Serie C players